Solar power is a fast developing industry in India. 
The country's solar installed capacity was 64.381 GWAC as of 31 February 2023. 
Solar power generation in India ranks fourth globally in 2021.

The Indian Government had an initial target of 20 GW capacity for 2022, which was achieved four years ahead of schedule. In 2015 the target was raised to 100 GW of solar capacity (including 40 GW from rooftop solar) by 2022, targeting an investment of 100 billion. India has established nearly 42 solar parks to make land available to the promoters of solar plants.

Rooftop solar power accounts for 2.1 GW in 2018, of which 70% is industrial or commercial. In addition to its large-scale grid-connected solar photovoltaic (PV) initiative, India is developing off-grid solar power for local energy needs. Solar products have increasingly helped to meet rural needs; by the end of 2015 just under one million solar lanterns were sold in the country, reducing the need for kerosene. That year,  solar home lighting systems were installed and 46,655 solar street lighting installations were provided under a national programme; just over 1.4 million (1.4 million) solar cookers were distributed in India.

During 2010–19, the foreign capital invested in India on Solar power projects was nearly 20.7 billion US$.

The International Solar Alliance (ISA), proposed by India as a founder member, is headquartered in India. India has also put forward the concept of "One Sun One World One Grid" and "World Solar Bank" to harness abundant solar power on global scale.

Solar potential

With about 300 clear and sunny days in a year, the calculated solar energy incidence on India's land area is about 5 quadrillion kilowatt-hours (kWh) per year (or 5 EWh/yr). The solar energy available in a single year exceeds the possible energy output of all of the fossil fuel energy reserves in India. The daily average solar-power-plant generation capacity in India is 0.30 kWh per m2 of used land area, equivalent to 1,400–1,800 peak (rated) capacity operating hours in a year with available, commercially-proven technology.

This solar-radiation measuring network provides the basis for the Indian solar-radiation atlas. 121 solar radiation resource assessment (SRRA) stations have been installed across India by the National Institute of Wind Energy, Ministry of New and Renewable Energy to create a database of solar-energy potential. Data is collected and reported to the Centre for Wind Energy Technology (C-WET). Among the parameters measured are Global Horizontal Irradiance (GHI), Direct Normal Irradiance (DNI) and Diffuse Horizontal Irradiance (DHI).

Installations by region

Installed capacity: national and state-wise

Andhra Pradesh 

Installed photo-voltaic capacity in Andhra Pradesh was 4257 MW as of 30 September 2022. The state is planning to add 10,050 MW solar power capacity to provide power supply to farming sector during the day time. The state has also offered five Ultra Mega Solar Power Projects with a total capacity of 12,200 MW to developers under renewable power export policy outside the state. Andhra Pradesh is endowed with abundant pumped hydroelectric energy storage to make available solar power in to round the clock power supply for meeting its ultimate energy needs. The state is planning to construct 33,000 MW pumped storage projects to mitigate the intermittency associated with renewable energy.

In 2015, NTPC agreed with APTransCo to install the 250-MW NP Kunta Ultra Mega Solar Power Project near Kadiri in Anantapur district. In October 2017, 1000 MW was commissioned at Kurnool Ultra Mega Solar Park which has become the world's largest solar power plant at that time. In August 2018, Greater Visakhapatnam commissioned a 2 MW Mudasarlova Reservoir grid-connected floating solar project which is the largest operational floating solar PV project in India. NTPC Simhadri has awarded BHEL to install a 25 MW floating solar PV plant on its water supply reservoir. APGENCO commissioned 400 MW Ananthapuram – II solar park located at Talaricheruvu village near Tadipatri.

Delhi
Delhi being the Capital and a city state in India, has limitation in installing ground based solar power plants. However it is leading in rooftop solar PV installations by adopting fully flexible net metering system. The installed solar power capacity is 211 MW as on 30 June 2022. Delhi government has announced that the Rajghat thermal power plant will be officially shut at the 45 acre plant site and turned into a 5 MW solar power PV plant.

Gujarat

Gujarat is one of India's most solar-developed states, with its total installed solar power generation capacity reaching 7,806 MW as of 30 June 2022.
Gujarat has been a leader in solar-power generation in India due to its high solar-power potential, availability of vacant land, connectivity, transmission and distribution infrastructure and utilities. According to a report by the Low Emission Development Strategies Global Partnership (LEDS GP) report, these attributes are complemented by political will and investment. The 2009 Solar Power of Gujarat policy framework, financing mechanism and incentives have contributed to a green investment climate in the state and the targets for grid-connected solar power.

The state has commissioned Asia's largest solar park near the village of Charanka in Patan district. The park is generating 345 MW by March 2016 of its 500 MW total planned capacity and has been cited as an innovative and environmentally-friendly project by the Confederation of Indian Industry. In December 2018, 700 MW Solar PV plant at Raghanesda Solar Park is contracted at ₹2.89/unit levelised tariff.

To make Gandhinagar a solar-power city, the state government has begun a rooftop solar-power generation scheme. Under the scheme, Gujarat plans to generate 5 MW of solar power by putting solar panels on about 50 state-government buildings and 500 private buildings.

It also plans to generate solar power by putting solar panels along the Narmada irrigation canals. As part of this scheme, the state has commissioned the 1 MW Canal Solar Power Project on a branch of the Narmada Canal near the village of Chandrasan in Mehsana district. The pilot project is expected to stop  of water per year from evaporating from the Narmada River.

In March 2022, Surat based Diamond Merchant Govind Dholakia aka Govind Kaka made his native in Amreli's Dudhala Complete Solarization. A 450 KW Solar Rooftop project will be used to power around 350 houses and public areas such as anganwadis and gram panchayat. Once complete, this would be the first village to be completely powered with solar panels by a Charitable trust or Foundation. Under the mentorship of Govind Dholakia who is the founder of SRKKF and his sole thought behind this initiative is to give it back to the society.

Haryana
State has set the 4.2 GW solar power (including 1.6 GW solar roof top) target by 2022 as it has high potential since it has at least 330 sunny days. Haryana is one of the fastest growing state in terms of solar energy with installed and commissioned capacity of 73.27 MW. Out of this, 57.88 MW was commissioned in FY 2016/17. Haryana solar power policy announced in 2016 offers 90% subsidy to farmers for the solar powered water pumps, which also offers subsidy for the solar street lighting, home lighting solutions, solar water heating schemes, solar cooker schemes. Haryana provides 100% waiver of electricity taxes, cess, electricity duty, wheeling charges, cross subsidy charges, transmission and distribution charges, etc. for rooftop solar projects.

In December 2018, Haryana had installed solar capacity of 48.80 MW, and in January 2019 Haryana floated tender for 300 MW grid-connected solar power, and additional 16 MW tender for the canal top solar power.

Karnataka
Karnataka is one of the highest solar power producing state in India with a total 7,597 MW installed capacity by the end of June 2022. The installed capacity of Pavagada Solar Park is 2050 MW by the end of year 2019 which was the world biggest solar park at that time.

Kerala
Installed capacity of solar plants in Kerala as on 31 May 2021 is 298 MW. Kochi international airport is the first airport to run completely in solar energy. CIAL solar farm is responsible for it. There are plans to setup solar power plants in Idukki, Wayanad, Malappuram and Palakkad districts.

First solar park in Kerala is located in Perla, Kasaragod Perla, Kasaragod. Floating Solar parks are being built and partly functional in Banasura Sagar , Idukki Dam and Vembanad Lake.

Ladakh
Ladakh, though a late entrant in solar power plants, is planning to install nearly 7,500 MW capacity in few years.

Madhya Pradesh
Madhya Pradesh had a total photovoltaic capacity of 1,117 MW by the end of July 2017. A 130 MW solar power plant project at Bhagwanpura, a village in Neemuch district, was launched by Prime Minister Narendra Modi. It is the largest solar producer, and Welspun Energy is one of the top three companies in India's renewable-energy sector. 
A planned 750 MW solar-power plant in Rewa district, the Rewa Ultra Mega Solar plant, was completed and inaugurated on 10 July 2020. Spread over 1,590 acres, it is Asia's largest solar power plant and was constructed at a cost of ₹4,500 crore. Madhya Pradesh I is a power plant under construction near Surajpur Village in the Shajapur district of Madhya Pradesh with 200 MW. It is scheduled to be operational by fall 2023.

Maharashtra

The 125-MW Sakri solar plant is the largest solar-power plant in Maharashtra. The Shri Saibaba Sansthan Trust has the world's largest solar steam system. The system is used to cook 50,000 meals per day for pilgrims visiting the shrine, resulting in annual savings of 100,000  kg of cooking gas, and was designed to generate steam for cooking even in the absence of electricity to run the circulating pump. The project to install and commission the system was completed in seven months, and the system has a design life of 25 years. The Osmanabad region in Maharashtra has abundant sunlight, and is ranked the third-best region in India in solar insolation. A 10 MW solar power plant in Osmanabad was commissioned in 2013. According to reports published by the National Institute of Solar Energy (NISE), its aggregate solar power potential capacity is 64.32 GW.

Rajasthan
Rajasthan is one of India's most solar-developed states, with its total photovoltaic capacity reaching 14,454 MW by end of June 2022. Rajasthan is also home to the world's largest Fresnel type 125 MW CSP plant at the Dhirubhai Ambani Solar Park. Jodhpur district leads the state with installed capacity of over 1,500 MW, followed by Jaisalmer and Bikaner.

The Bhadla Solar Park, with total installed capacity of 2,245 MW, is the biggest plant in the world as of March 2020.

The only tower type solar thermal power plant (2.5 MW) in India is located in Bikaner district.

In March 2019, the lowest tariff in India is ₹2.48/kWh for installing the 750 MW solar power plants in the state.

Rajasthan became the first state with 10GW of solar power capacity. It is targeting a capacity of 30 GW by Financial Year 2024-2025 and 75 GW by 2030.

Tamil Nadu
Tamil Nadu had the 5th highest operating solar-power capacity in India in May 2018. The total operating capacity in Tamil Nadu was 1.8 GW. On 1 July 2017, the solar power tariff in Tamil Nadu has hit an all-time low of ₹3.47 per unit when bidding for 1500 MW capacity was held.

The 648-MW Kamuthi Solar Power Project is the biggest operating project in the state. On 1 January 2018, NLC India Limited (NLCIL) commissioned a new 130 MW solar power project in Neyveli.

As of 2021, total installed capacity stands at 4.3 GW, with plans for capacity to double by 2022.

Telangana 
Telangana ranks sixth when it comes to solar energy generation capacity in India. The state has a solar power generation capacity of 3,953 MW and plans to achieve a capacity of 5,000 MW by 2022. In 2019, NTPC Ramagundam had placed work order on Bharat Heavy Electricals Limited (BHEL) to install 100 MW floating solar PV plant on its water supply reservoir. 
In July 2022, NTPC's 100 MW floating solar photovoltaic (PV) project becomes fully operational in Telangana and becomes India's largest floating solar plant equipped with cutting-edge technology and environmentally friendly features.

Electricity generation

Including both ground and roof mounted plants, the country's installed solar power capacity was 39,083 MW as of 28 February 2021.

Solar electricity generation from April 2021 to March 2022 increased to 73.48 terawatt-hour (TWh) from 60.4 TWh in the same period a year ago.

Installations by application 

The installed capacity is generally given in DC capacity at standard operating conditions. The actual AC power peak output at high voltage from a solar plant is between 65 to 75% of the rated DC capacity, after accounting for temperature coefficient, derating of solar cells capacity with time, losses in the total system, elevation of the plant, location of the plant, actual solar irradiance, etc. The AC peak power is also generally limited by the selected inverter's capacity for economic reasons.

As of September 2022, the rooftop solar power generation capacity is 8.3 GW. Rooftop solar can be divided into residential solar, commercial and industrial solar roofs as well as a range of installations including agricultural buildings, community and cultural centers. 70 per cent of rooftop solar in 2018 was in the industrial and commercial sectors, with just 20 per cent as residential rooftop solar. Rooftop solar as a proportion of total solar installations is much less than is typical in other leading solar countries but was forecast to grow to 40 GW by 2022 under national targets. A rough calculation would imply that India had around just 430 MW of residential rooftop solar, whilst the UK with around half the overall solar capacity of India had over 2,500 MW of residential solar in 2018. The smallest segment was off-grid solar at 1467 MW which could help play a role in reaching villages and dwellings without access to the national grid.

The open-access solar installation capacity reached 7.0 GW capacity as of September 2022.

Concentrated solar power
The installed capacity of commercial concentrated solar power plants (non-storage type) in India is 227.5 MW with 50 MW in Andhra Pradesh and 177.5 MW in Rajasthan. The existing solar thermal power plants (non-storage type) in India, which are generating costly intermittent power on a daily basis, can be converted into storage type solar thermal plants to generate 3 to 4 times more base load power at cheaper cost and not depend on government subsidies. In March 2020, SECI called for 5000 MW tenders which can be combination of solar PV with battery storage, solar thermal with thermal energy storage (including biomass firing as supplementary fuel) and coal based power (minimum 51% from renewable sources) to supply round the clock power at minimum 80% yearly availability.

Hybrid solar plants
Solar power, generated mainly during the daytime in the non-monsoon period, complements wind which generate power during the monsoon months in India. Solar panels can be located in the space between the towers of wind power plants. It also complements hydroelectricity, generated primarily during India's monsoon months. Solar-power plants can be installed near existing hydropower and pumped-storage hydroelectricity, using the existing power transmission infrastructure and storing the surplus secondary power generated by the solar PV plants. Floating solar plants on the reservoirs of pumped-storage hydroelectric plants are complementary to each other. Solar PV plants clubbed with pumped-storage hydroelectric plants are also under construction to supply peaking power.

During the daytime, the additional auxiliary power consumption of a solar thermal storage power plant is nearly 10% of its rated capacity for the process of extracting solar energy in the form of thermal energy. This auxiliary power requirement can be made available from cheaper solar PV plant by envisaging hybrid solar plant with a mix of solar thermal and solar PV plants at a site. Also to optimise the cost of power, generation can be from the cheaper solar PV plant (33% generation) during the daylight whereas the rest of the time in a day is from the solar thermal storage plant (67% generation from solar power tower and parabolic trough types) for meeting 24 hours baseload power. When solar thermal storage plant is forced to idle due to lack of sunlight locally during cloudy days in monsoon season, it is also possible to consume (similar to a lesser efficient, huge capacity and low cost battery storage system) the cheap excess grid power when the grid frequency is above 50 hz for heating the hot molten salt to higher temperature for converting stored thermal energy in to electricity during the peak demand hours when the electricity sale price is profitable.

Solar heating

Generating hot water or air or steam using concentrated solar reflectors, is increasing rapidly. Presently concentrated solar thermal installation base for heating applications is about 20 MWth in India and expected to grow rapidly. 

Bengaluru has the largest deployment of roof-top solar water heaters in India, generating an energy equivalent of 200 MW. Pune has also made solar water heaters mandatory in new buildings. Photovoltaic thermal (PVT) panels produce simultaneously the required warm water/air along with electricity under sunlight.

Rural electrification
The lack of an electricity infrastructure is a hurdle to rural India's development. India's power grid is under-developed, with large groups of people still living off the grid. In 2004, about 80,000 of the nation's villages still did not have electricity, 18,000 out of them could not be electrified by extending the conventional grid due to inconvenience. A target of electrifying 5,000 such villages was set for the 2002–2007 Five-Year Plan. By 2004 more than 2,700 villages and hamlets were electrified, primarily with solar photovoltaic systems. The development of inexpensive solar technology is considered a potential alternative, providing an electricity infrastructure consisting of a network of local-grid clusters with distributed electricity generation. It could bypass (or relieve) expensive, long-distance, centralised power-delivery systems, bringing inexpensive electricity to large groups of people. In Rajasthan during Financial Year 2016–17, 91 villages have been electrified with a solar standalone system and over 6,200 households have received a 100W solar home-lighting system.

India has sold or distributed about 1.2 million solar home-lighting systems and 3.2 million solar lanterns, and has been ranked the top Asian market for solar off-grid products.

Lamps and lighting
By 2012, a total of 4,600,000 solar lanterns and 861,654 solar-powered home lights were installed. Typically replacing kerosene lamps, they can be purchased for the cost of a few months' worth of kerosene with a small loan. The Ministry of New and Renewable Energy is offering a 30- to 40-percent subsidy of the cost of lanterns, home lights and small systems (up to 210 Wp). Twenty million solar lamps are expected by 2022.

Agricultural support
Solar photovoltaic water-pumping systems are used for irrigation and drinking water. By 31 October 2019 a total of 181,521 solar photovoltaic water pumping systems were installed and total solar photovoltaic water pumping systems would reach 3.5 million by the year 2022 under PM KUSUM scheme. During hot sunny daytime when the water needs are more for watering the fields, solar pumps performance can be improved by maintaining pumped water flowing/sliding over the solar panels to keep them cooler and clean. Agro photovoltaics is the electricity generation without losing agriculture production by using the same land. Solar driers are used to dry harvests for storage. Low cost solar powered bicycles are also available to ply between fields and village for agricultural activity, etc. On site/field, fertiliser is produced from air by solar power with no carbon emissions.

Rainwater harvesting
In addition to solar energy, rainwater is a major renewable resource of any area. In India, large areas are being covered by solar PV panels every year. Solar panels can also be used for harvesting most of the rainwater falling on them and drinking or breweries water quality, free from bacteria and suspended matter, can be generated by simple filtration and disinfection processes, as rainwater is very low in salinity. Good quality water resources, closer to populated areas, are becoming a scarcity and increasingly costly for consumers. Exploitation of rainwater for value-added products like bottled drinking water makes solar PV power plants profitable even in high rainfall and cloudy areas by the increased income from drinking water generation.

Refrigeration and air conditioning

Hence power draw from the grid which is an assured power supply without much power cuts nowadays, serves as a cheaper backup source when grid power consumption is limited to lower slab rate by using solar power during the day time. The maximum power generation of solar panels during the sunny daytime is complementary with the enhanced residential electricity consumption during the hot/summer days due to the higher use of cooling appliances such as fans, refrigerators, air conditioners, desert coolers, etc. It would discourage the Discoms to extract higher electricity charges selectively from its consumers. There is no need of any permission from Discoms similar to DG power sets installation. Cheaper discarded batteries of electric vehicle can also be used economically to store the excess solar power generated in the daylight.

Maximum solar-electricity generation during the hot hours of the day can be used for meeting residential air-conditioning requirements regardless of other load requirements, such as refrigeration, lighting, cooking, and water pumping. Power generation of photovoltaic modules can be increased by 17 to 20 per cent by equipping them with a tracking system.

In regions where peak electricity demand occurs in the evening, precooling of houses by increasing A/C settings in the afternoon as well as air conditioning systems combined with chilled water storage can increase the value of PV to the system and facilitate high shares of PV in total electricity generation. Using both options to better match AC electricity demand with PV electricity supply could increase cost-optimal shares of PV in total electricity by up to 15 percentage points.

Grid stabilisation
Solar-power plants equipped with battery storage systems where net energy metering is used can feed stored electricity into the power grid when its frequency is below the rated parameter (50 Hz) and draw excess power from the grid when its frequency is above the rated parameter. Excursions above and below the rated grid frequency occur about 100 times daily. The solar-plant owner would receive nearly double the price for electricity sent into the grid compared to that consumed from the grid if a frequency-based tariff is offered to rooftop solar plants or plants dedicated to a distribution substation. A power-purchase agreement (PPA) is not needed for solar plants with a battery storage systems to serve ancillary-service operations and transmit generated electricity for captive consumption using an open-access facility. Battery storage is popular in India, with more than 10 million households using battery backup during load shedding. Battery storage systems are also used to improve the power factor. Solar PV or wind paired with four-hour battery storage systems is already cost competitive, without subsidy and power purchase agreement by selling peak power in Indian Energy Exchange, as a source of dispatchable generation compared with new coal and new gas plants in India". Battery energy storage system cost have come down drastically in India for a mega storage capacity of 500 MW with four hours daily power supply (two round trip cycles per day) at full capacity.

India is experiencing morning peak power demand for nearly 6 months from November to April and the solar power generation from 6 am to 10 am is not adequate to meet morning peak demand as its availability peaks at midday time. However solar power panels can be oriented/fixed towards the south-eastern direction (nearly 10° towards the east from the south direction) to capture more sunlight for enhanced solar power generation during peak hours. Higher solar tariffs during morning hours enable the solar power plants to cater the maximum peak demand of the national grid reducing the load on peaking hydropower or load-following power plants.

Battery storage is also used economically to reduce daily/monthly peak power demand for minimising the monthly demand charges from the utility to the commercial and industrial establishments. Using batteries to shift PV electricity from times with very high generation (noon) to times with low generation (evening, night, morning) can increase the cost-optimal share of PV in the future Indian power system substantially, from 40–50% without batteries to 60–90% with batteries.

Challenges and opportunities

The land price is costly for acquisition in India. Dedication of land for the installation of solar arrays must compete with other needs. One alternative is to use the water-surface area on canals, lakes, reservoirs, farm ponds and the sea for large solar-power plants. Due to better cooling of the solar panels and the sun tracking system, the output of solar panels is enhanced substantially. These water bodies can also provide water to clean the solar panels. Floating solar plants installation cost has reduced steeply by 2018. In January 2019, Indian Railways announced the plan to install 4 GW capacity along its tracks. Highways and railways may also avoid the cost of land nearer to load centers, minimizing transmission-line costs by having solar plants about 10 meters above the roads or rail tracks. Solar power generated by road areas may also be used for in-motion charging of electric vehicles, reducing fuel costs. Highways would avoid damage from rain and summer heat, increasing comfort for commuters. By using high efficiency monocrystalline silicon modules in a earth mount solar array, the cost of module supporting structures and the land requirement are reduced drastically without reduction in electricity generation. Earth mounted solar arrays can withstand category 4 hurricane and designed for water submergence condition. To reduce land footprint drastically where land cost is high, vertical installation of solar panels forming a solar tower is also feasible. These transmission towers have nearly 50,000 MW solar PV potential @ of 25 kW/tower if panels are installed on the south-facing facade.

The architecture best suited to most of India would be a set of rooftop power-generation systems connected 
via a local grid. Not only the rooftop area but also outer surface area of tall buildings can be used for solar PV power generation by installing PV modules in a vertical position in place of glass panels to cover facade area. Such an infrastructure, which does not have the economy of scale of mass, utility-scale solar-panel deployment, needs a lower deployment price to attract individuals and family-sized households. The cost of high efficiency and compact mono PERC modules and battery storage systems have reduced to make rooftop solar PV more economical and feasible in a microgrid. 

It is more economical to have multi-purpose floating solar PV power plants compared to single-purpose floating solar plants. Three tier boat houses are constructed on pontoons with the top tier (inclined roof up to 35 degrees) fully covered by solar panels (1 MW/acre area), bottom area (below the pontoon) for cage fish culture and middle two tiers one each for poultry and mushroom/orchid cultivation. Pontoon can have a tilting arrangement (another 35 degrees) to have inclined floating by varying water content in the ballast tanks to track the sun's direction for optimum solar power generation. Water is oxygenated in a evaporative cooler and used in cage cultivation with the power generated by the solar panels. The cold air at wet-bulb temperature from the evaporative cooler is used for cooling the poultry and mushroom areas. These boathouses can move to safer water depths with the variation in the water level of the water body or for avoiding occasional high winds. The excess power generated during the daytime is stored in a battery system mounted on a separate pontoon which can be moved to shore for feeding power to the grid during nighttime. Multipurpose solar plants can be installed at deeper (10 meters and more) water areas, unlike single-purpose floating solar PV plants. With multipurpose PV solar plants, the floating solar power potential of India enhances many times by using much of the inland water bodies area. Water is sprinkled over the solar panels to keep them cool and clean to optimize the power output. Rainwater harvesting can also be achieved by storing the water in collapsible bladders which can float on water for generating bottled drinking water. 

Greenpeace recommends that India adopt a policy of developing solar power as a dominant component of its renewable-energy mix since, being a densely-populated country in the tropical belt, the subcontinent has an ideal combination of high insolation and a large potential consumer base. In one scenario India could make renewable resources the backbone of its economy by 2030, curtailing carbon emissions without compromising its economic-growth potential. A study suggested that 100 GW of solar power could be generated through a mix of utility-scale and rooftop solar, with the realisable potential for rooftop solar between 57 and 76 GW by 2024.

It is considered prudent to encourage solar-plant installations up to a threshold (such as 7,000 MW) by offering incentives. Otherwise, substandard equipment with overrated nameplate capacity may tarnish the industry. The power purchaser, transmission agency and financial institution should require capacity utilisation and long-term performance guarantees for the equipment backed by insurance coverage in the event that the original equipment manufacturer ceases to exist. Alarmed by the low quality of equipment, India issued draft quality guide lines in May 2017 to be followed by the solar plant equipment suppliers conforming to Indian standards.

Government support
The budget encouraged private solar companies by reducing the import duty on solar panels by five per cent. This is expected to reduce the cost of a rooftop solar-panel installation by 15 to 20 per cent.

Solar PV tariff

The current prices of solar PV electricity is around 18% lower than the average price of electricity generated by coal-fired plants. By the end of 2018, competitive reverse auctions, falling panel and component prices, the introduction of solar parks, lower borrowing costs and large power companies have contributed to the fall in prices. The cost of solar PV power in India, China, Brazil and 55 other emerging markets fell to about one-third of its 2010 price, making solar the cheapest form of renewable energy and cheaper than power generated from fossil fuels such as coal and gas.

India has the lowest capital cost per MW globally of installing solar power plants. However the global levelised cost of solar PV electricity fell to 1.04¢ US per kWh (₹0.77 per kWh) in April 2021, much cheaper than the lowest solar PV tariff in India. The intermittent / non-dispatchable solar PV at the prevailing low tariffs clubbed with Pumped-heat electricity storage can offer cheapest dispatchable power round the clock on demand.

The applicable tariff is offered after applying viability gap funding (VGF) or accelerated depreciation (AD) incentives. In January 2019, the time period for commissioning the solar power plants is reduced to 18 months for units located outside the solar parks and 15 months for units located inside the solar parks from the date of power purchase agreement.

In first quarter of calendar year 2020, large scale ground mounted solar power installations cost fell to Rs 35 million/MW by 12% in a year. Solar panel prices are lower than those of mirrors by unit area.

The tariff is also lower than NTPC's average coal power tariff of 3.20 per kilowatt hour. These tariffs are lower than traded prices for day time in non-monsoon period in IEX and also for meeting peak loads on a daily basis by using cheaper solar PV power in pumped-storage hydroelectricity stations indicating there is no need of any power purchase agreements and any incentives for the solar PV power plants in India. Solar PV power plant developers are forecasting that solar power tariff would drop to  /unit in near future.

The lowest solar tariff in May 2018 is Rs 2.71/kWh (without incentives) which is less than the tariff of Bhadla solar park (₹2.44 per kWh with VGF incentive) after the clarification that any additional taxes are pass through cost with hike in the tariff. In June 2019, the lowest tariff is /kWh for feeding in to the high voltage interstate transmission system (ISTS).

In August 2022, the installation cost of rooftop solar has reduced below 45,000 Rs/KW for capacity between 1 to 3 KW. 

Incentives
At the end of July 2015, the chief incentives were:
Viability Gap Funding: Under the reverse bidding process, bidders who need least viability gap funding at the reference tariff (RS 4.93 per unit in 2016) is selected. Funding was ₹1 Crore/MW for open projects on average in 2016.
Depreciation: For profit-making enterprises installing rooftop solar systems, 40 per cent of the total investment could be claimed as depreciation in the first year (decreasing taxes).
Liberal external commercial borrowing facility for the solar power plants.
To protect the local solar panel manufacturers, 25% safe guard duty is imposed for two years period from August 2018 on the imports from China & Malaysia who are suspected of dumping solar panels in to India.
Capital subsidies were applicable to rooftop solar-power plants up to a maximum of 500 kW. The 30 per cent subsidy was reduced to 15 per cent.
Renewable Energy Certificates (RECs): Tradeable certificates providing financial incentives for every unit of green power generated.
Net metering incentives depend on whether a net meter is installed and the utility's incentive policy. If so, financial incentives are available for the power generated.
Assured Power Purchase Agreement (PPA): The power-distribution and -purchase companies owned by state and central governments guarantee the purchase of solar PV power when produced only during daylight. The PPAs offer fair market determined tariff for the solar power which is a secondary power or negative load and an intermittent energy source on a daily basis.
Interstate transmission system (ISTS) charges and losses are not levied during the period of PPA for the projects commissioned before 31 March 2022.
Union government offers 70% and 30% subsidy for the hill states and other states respectively for the installation of rooftop solar units. Additional incentives are offered to rooftop solar power plants from various state governments.
100% foreign direct investment (FDI) is automatically permitted, subject to the provisions of The Electricity Act, 2003, to install solar power plants.

Indian initiative of International solar alliance
 In January 2016, Prime Minister Narendra Modi and French President François Hollande laid the foundation stone for the headquarters of the International Solar Alliance (ISA) in Gwal Pahari, Gurugram. The ISA will focus on promoting and developing solar energy and solar products for countries lying wholly or partially between the Tropic of Cancer and the Tropic of Capricorn. The alliance of over 120 countries was announced at the Paris COP21 climate summit.

Solar-panel manufacturing in India
As of November 2021, manufacturing capacity of solar cells and solar modules in India was 4.3 GW and 18 GW, respectively. Nearly 80 per cent of solar-panel's weight is flat glass. 100–150 tons of flat glass is used to manufacture a MW of solar panels. Low-iron flat or float glass is manufactured from soda ash and iron-free silica. Soda-ash manufacturing from common salt is an energy-intensive process unless it is extracted from soda lakes or glasswort cultivation in alkali soil. To increase installation of photovoltaic solar-power plants, the production of flat glass and its raw materials must expand commensurately to eliminate supply constraints or future imports.

The Ministry of New and Renewable Energy (MNRE), India, has issued a memorandum to ensure the quality of solar cells and solar modules. Compliance with the requisite specifications will grant manufacturers and their specific products an entry in the ALMM (Approved List of Models and Manufacturers.) Indian manufacturers are gradually enhancing the production capacity of monocrystalline silicon PERC cells to supply better performing and enduring solar cells to local market.

For utility scale solar projects, top solar module suppliers in 2016–17 were: Waaree Energies Ltd., Trina Solar, JA Solar, Canadian Solar, Risen, and Hanwha.

Major photovoltaic power stations

Below is a list of solar power generation facilities with a capacity of at least 20 MW.

See also

 Renewable energy in India
 Electricity sector in India
 Energy policy of India
 Cost of electricity by source
 Wind power in India
 Biofuels in India
 Hydroelectric power in India
 Growth of photovoltaics
 Index of solar energy articles

References

External links

 Solar Performance Tracker. Center for Strategic and International Studies
 Annual Report 2015-16. MNRE
 Annual Report 2018-19. MNRE. Archived on 21 April 2021.
 Annual Report 2020-2021. MNRE. Archived on 21 April 2021.

 
India